Onde 2000 is a motorcycle racing team previously competing in the 125 cc road racing Grand Prix world championship. The team withdrew from MotoGP after 8 races in the 2009 season due to financial difficulties.

In 2009, the team competed in 6 races under the name Grupo Francisco Hernando and using a Ducati Desmosedici motorcycle.

History

2008
The team was officially launched early in 2008, running two bikes in the 125 cc Grand Prix category. The team entered two KTM motorcycles, ridden by Pablo Nieto and Raffaele de Rosa.

2009
Onde 2000 stepped up to the MotoGP class in 2009 with the Spanish rider Sete Gibernau riding a Ducati Desmosedici. however financial problems restricted them to 6 rounds ending with the US GP with a best result of 11th at the Spanish Grand Prix.

References

External links 
 Onde 2000 Team Official website

Motorcycle racing teams
Motorcycle racing teams established in 2008
2008 establishments in Spain
Motorcycle racing teams disestablished in 2009
2009 disestablishments in Spain